Kabaddi Kabaddi is a 2003 Indian Telugu-language sports romantic comedy film produced by Valluripalli Ramesh Babu for Maharshi Cinema, and directed by Venky. Starring Jagapati Babu, Kalyani  and music composed by Chakri.

Plot
The film begins in the village Venkannapalem where Rambabu a typical village bloke is the son of a weaver Veerabhadrayah. He spends most of his time with his gang from different age groups. Kaveri is the sister of Nagendra head of the adjacent village Sakhinetipally. Nagendra is the coach of the Sakhinetipally Kabaddi team which has won 99 matches continuously all over the state. Rambabu crushes Kaveri at the first sight, and after a while, she too responds. Nagendra objects to it as Rambabu is wayward. In the clash, Rambabu challenges to defeat the Sakhinetipally Kabaddi team and asks for Kaveri's hand in bonus, Nagendra agrees to it. Now, Rambabu is in the process of gathering his team, he requires 11 members to play, but no one comes to his aid. So, he makes out his team with help of his friends Bosu, Seenu, Appa Rao, President, Krishna Rao, and Sastry respectively. After strenuous training, D-day arrives. The rest of the story is about Rambabu & his team triumphing in the finale and gaining his fiancée.

Cast

 Jagapati Babu as Rambabu
 Kalyani as Kaveri 
 Brahmanandam as Bachi Baba
 Tanikella Bharani as Veerabhadrayah
 M. S. Narayana as Kabaddi Coach Appa Rao
 Jaya Prakash Reddy as Head Constable
 Kondavalasa as Krishna Rao 
 Krishna Bhagawan as Bosu
 Raghu Babu as Seenu
 Suman Setty as Sastry
 Surya as Nagendra
 Chinna as Madman
 Poti Prasad as Villager
 Sarika Ramachandra Rao as Anjineelu
 Gundu Sudarshan as Priest
 Gautam Raju as Villager
 Jeeva as President Rama Rao
 Jenny as Kabaddi Refinery Chinna Rao
 Rajitha as Rani
 Preeti Nigam as Nagendra's wife

Soundtrack

The music for the film was composed by Chakri and released by Aditya Music Company.

Reception 
A critic from Sify said that "The most difficult aspect of a comedy film is that it should make the audience laugh. Kabaddi Kabaddi is meant to be a laugh riot and to a certain extent the director has succeeded in achieving that".

References

External links

2003 films
2000s Telugu-language films
Indian romantic comedy films
Indian sports comedy films
2003 romantic comedy films
2000s sports comedy films
Films scored by Chakri